Joseph Magnus Stäck (4 April 181221 February 1868) was a Swedish landscape painter and art professor.

Biography
Stäck was born at Lund, Sweden. 
His father,  Joseph Stäck  was a hawker and wig maker. His grandfather, Balthasar Stecchi (b. 1728) was of Bolognese origin. The family had been known  as "Stechow" and "Stächof" prior to adopting the surname Stäck.
His childhood home also served as a  boarding house. It was home to the painter, Andreas Arfwidsson (1786-1831) and two other young men who would become artists: Gustaf Wilhelm Palm (1810-1890) and  P. Magnus Körner (1808-1864). His first lessons may have been provided by Arfwidsson.    

He enrolled at Lund University with the apparent intent of becoming a physician, although he never joined the Faculty of Medicine. He had already passed the "Examen Theologicum" and  earned a Master of Philosophy (Examen pro Exercitio)  when, he later wrote, the "painter took over". In 1832, he followed his friends Palm and Körner and enrolled at the Royal Swedish Academy of Fine Arts. While studying with Carl Johan Fahlcrantz (1774-1861) he decided to specialize in landscape painting. 

He held several successful exhibits at the salon of the Swedish Association for Art (Sveriges Allmänna Konstförening). In 1840, nine paintings had been sold before the exhibition opened to the public. He sold another thirteen paintings in 1843. During this time, in 1842, he received a scholarship that enabled him to visit Munich, Venice and Rome, where he stayed for three years. He also studied the works of Johan Christian Dahl, of which there were a large number in Dresden. He completed his studies in Paris and exhibited at the Salon in 1847. During the French Revolution of 1848, he remained there until his money ran out, even though his friends urged him to leave.  

While travelling through Northern Italy, he had become ill with what was apparently a form of rheumatic fever or malaria. The symptoms would return periodically for the rest of his life and make him unable to work. In 1852, he was named a professor at the Royal Academy and was elected Chairman of the Sveriges Allmänna Konstförening. He retained the latter position until 1858, when the increasing workload interfered with his painting and he resigned. A trip to Düsseldorf, which was then becoming a major art center, proved fruitless due to a recurrence of his illness that made him bedridden. He returned to the Academy in 1860. He died at  Stockholm in 1868.

Gallery

References

Other  Sources 
Georg Nordensvan: Svensk konst och svenska konstnärer i nittonde århundradet, Stockholm : Bonnier, 1928
Gertrud Serner: Joseph Magnus Stäck - 1812-1868, Malmö : Skånes konstförenings publikation, 1934

External links 

 Biography @ the Svenskt Biografiskt Lexikon
 More works by Stäck @ ArtNet

1812 births
1868 deaths
Swedish painters
Swedish landscape painters
People from Lund